Market Bosworth railway station is a former stop on the London and North Western Railway and the Midland Railway, who jointly operated the line between Moira West Junction and Nuneaton as the Ashby and Nuneaton Joint Railway. The station was designed by the Midland Railway company architect John Holloway Sanders.

The station is to the west of the market town of Market Bosworth.

Original station buildings survive on platform 1, used by the private Station Garage. The track in platform one is a siding, used for the storage of wagons and diesel shunters in various states of disrepair. Platform 2 is on the running line and is the only one in use. The signal box also survives, as do several semaphore signals, though this signalling is not in commission thus the station is an unsignalled halt.

Volunteers have been slowly restoring the station. The station encountered severe vandalism at Easter 2008 with one building, the Permanent Way hut, completely destroyed by arson. Any windows that were originally intact in the signalbox were smashed. Nonetheless, the railway continues to restore the station. In May 2009, a passenger train hauled by LNER Thompson Class B1 No. 61306 halted at the station for the first time in at least ten years to allow passengers to see the progress at the station.

On the weekend of 19–20 March 2011, completion of a foot crossing at the south end of the station enabled it to be opened to the public for the first time.  There is a car park in the former goods yard but only very basic facilities for passengers.

There is a long-term aspiration to restore the passing loop at the station to allow two train operation over the line.

References

Heritage railway stations in Leicestershire
Buildings and structures in the United Kingdom destroyed by arson
Railway stations in Great Britain opened in 1873
Railway stations in Great Britain closed in 1931
John Holloway Sanders railway stations
Market Bosworth